Mardasavas (Marcinkonys) is a village in Varėna district municipality, in Alytus County, in southeastern Lithuania. According to the 2011 census, the village has a population of 26 people.

Mardasavas village is located c.  from Varėna,  from Druskininkai,  from Puvočiai (the nearest settlement).

References

Villages in Alytus County
Varėna District Municipality